Roger Hale Sheaffe (9 April 1838 – 1 December 1895) was a pastoralist and member of the Queensland Legislative Assembly.

Early days
Sheaffe was born at Wollongong, New South Wales, to William Sheaffe, Captain in H.M. 50th Regiment, and his wife Rosalie (née Earle) and was educated at Wollongong Grammar School.

Political career
Sheaffe was elected to the Queensland Legislative Assembly as the member for Burke in 1878 but did not stand for re-election in 1883. He went on to be mayor of Sandgate in 1892.

Personal life
In 1874, Sheaffe married Isobel Maria Robertson in Wollongong and together had 3 sons and 1 daughter. Sheaffe died in Brisbane in 1895 and was buried in Toowong Cemetery.

References

Members of the Queensland Legislative Assembly
1838 births
1895 deaths
Burials at Toowong Cemetery
19th-century Australian politicians